Neosuris is a genus of dirt-colored seed bugs in the family Rhyparochromidae. There are at least three described species in Neosuris.

Species
These three species belong to the genus Neosuris:
 Neosuris castanea (Barber, 1911)
 Neosuris fulgidus (Barber, 1918)
 Neosuris intermedius Brailovsky, 1978

References

Rhyparochromidae
Articles created by Qbugbot